A railroad switch, turnout, or [set of] points is a mechanical installation enabling railway trains to be guided from one track to another, such as at a railway junction or where a spur or siding branches off.

The most common type of switch consists of a pair of linked tapering rails, known as points (switch rails or point blades), lying between the diverging outer rails (the stock rails). These points can be moved laterally into one of two positions to direct a train coming from the point blades toward the straight path or the diverging path. A train moving from the narrow end toward the point blades (i.e. it will be directed to one of the two paths, depending on the position of the points) is said to be executing a facing-point movement.

For many types of switch, a train coming from either of the converging directions will pass through the switch regardless of the position of the points, as the vehicle's wheels will force the points to move. Passage through a switch in this direction is known as a trailing-point movement and switches that allow this type of movement are called trailable switches.

A switch generally has a straight "through" track (such as the main-line) and a diverging route. The handedness of the installation is described by the side that the diverging track leaves. Right-hand switches have a diverging path to the right of the straight track, when coming from the point blades, and a left-handed switch has the diverging track leaving to the opposite side. In many cases, such as rail yards, many switches can be found in a short section of track, sometimes with switches going both to the right and left (although it is better to keep these separated as much as feasible). Sometimes a switch merely divides one track into two; at others, it serves as a connection between two or more parallel tracks, allowing a train to switch between them. In many cases, where a switch is supplied to leave a track, a second is supplied to allow the train to reenter the track some distance down the line; this allows the track to serve as a siding, allowing a train to get off the track to allow traffic to pass (this siding can either be a dedicated short length of track, or formed from a section of a second, continuous, parallel line), and also allows trains coming from either direction to switch between lines; otherwise, the only way for a train coming from the opposite direction to use a switch would be to stop, and reverse through the switch onto the other line, and then continue forwards (or stop, if it is being used as a siding).

A straight track is not always present; for example, both tracks may curve, one to the left and one to the right (such as for a wye switch), or both tracks may curve, with differing radii, while still in the same direction. Switches consume a relatively high proportion of a railway maintenance budget.

History 

Simple single-bladed switches were used on early wooden railways to move wagons between tracks. As iron-railed plateways became more common in the eighteenth century, cast iron components were made to build switches with check rails. In 1797, John Curr described the system that he developed which used a single iron blade, hinged on a vertical pin that was tapered to lie against the plateway. By 1808, Curr's basic design was in common use.

The switch was patented by Charles Fox in 1838.

Prior to the widespread availability of electricity, switches at heavily travelled junctions were operated from a signal box constructed near the tracks through an elaborate system of rods and levers. The levers were also used to control railway signals to control the movement of trains over the points. Eventually, mechanical systems known as interlockings were introduced to make sure that a signal could only be set to allow a train to proceed over points when it was safe to do so. Purely mechanical interlockings were eventually developed into integrated systems with electric control. On some low-traffic branch lines, in self-contained marshalling yards, or on heritage railways, switches may still have the earlier type of interlocking.

Operation 

A railroad car's wheels are primarily guided along the tracks by coning of the wheels, rather than relying on the flanges located on the insides of the wheels. When the wheels reach the switch, the wheels are guided along the route determined by which of the two points is connected to the track facing the switch. In the illustration, if the left point is connected, the left wheel will be guided along the rail of that point, and the train will diverge to the right. If the right point is connected, the right wheel's flange will be guided along the rail of that point, and the train will continue along the straight track. Only one of the points may be connected to the facing track at any time; the two points are mechanically locked together to ensure that this is always the case.

A mechanism is provided to move the points from one position to the other (change the points). Historically, this would require a lever to be moved by a human operator, and some switches are still controlled this way. However, most are now operated by a remotely controlled actuator called a point machine; this may employ an electric motor or a pneumatic or hydraulic actuator. This both allows for remote control and monitoring and for the use of stiffer, strong switches that would be too difficult to move by hand, yet allow for higher speeds.

In a trailing-point movement (running through the switch in the wrong direction while they are set to turn off the track), the flanges on the wheels will force the points to the proper position. This is sometimes known as running through the switch. Some switches are designed to be forced to the proper position without damage. Examples include variable switches, spring switches, and weighted switches.

If a switch becomes worn or the operating rods become damaged, it is possible for the flange to split the switch, and go through the switch in the direction other than what was expected. This happens when the flange strikes a small gap between the fixed rail and the set switch point (whichever is touching the main line); this forces the switch open, and the train is diverted down the incorrect track. This can either happen to the locomotive, in which case the whole train can be directed onto the wrong track, with potentially dangerous results, or it can occur at any point through the train, when a random truck is directed down a different track from the rest of the train; if this happens on the front truck of a car, the usual result is derailment, as the trailing truck of the preceding car attempts to go one way, while the leading truck of the following car tries to go another. If it happens to the trailing truck of a car, the front truck will follow one track, while the trailing truck follows a parallel line; this causes the whole car to "crab", or move sideways down the track (derailment often results eventually, due to the lateral forces applied when the train tries to brake or accelerate). This can have disastrous results if there is any obstacle between the lines, as the car will be propelled into it sideways, such as happened in the 1928 Times Square derailment. In some cases, the whole train behind the car will follow the errant car onto the other track; in others, only one or a few trucks are diverted, while the rest follow the correct track. In cases where it is a simple siding, rather than a continuous parallel track, the diverted truck(s) can travel the whole length of the siding until it turns back to the main track, where it performs a trailing point movement, forces the switch open, and ends up back on the same track again, with only damage to the switches. This is far less likely in cases of diversion to a parallel track, since switches on both lines will often be interconnected, so to set the switch on the main line to straight-through will set the other switch to straight-through as well (otherwise there is a risk of turning off the track only to find the joining switch is set the wrong way, and running the train through it). Because derailments are expensive and very dangerous to life and limb, maintenance of switch points and other trackwork is essential, especially with faster trains. Another derailment that occurred due to a split switch is the ProRail Hilversum derailment on 15 January 2014.

If the points are rigidly connected to the switch control mechanism, the control mechanism's linkages may be bent, requiring repair before the switch is again usable. For this reason, switches are normally set to the proper position before performing a trailing-point movement.

High-speed operation 
Generally, switches are designed to be safely traversed at low speed. However, it is possible to modify the simpler types of switch to allow trains to pass at high speed. More complicated switch systems, such as double slips, are restricted to low-speed operation.

Operation in cold conditions 

Under cold weather conditions, snow and ice can prevent the proper movement of switch or frog point rails, essentially inhibiting the proper operation of railroad switches. Historically, railway companies have employees keep their railroad switches clear of snow and ice by sweeping the snow away using switch brooms (Basically wire brooms with a chisel attached onto the opposite end of the broom – quite similar to ice scrapers used today), or gas torches for melting ice and snow. Such operation are still used in some countries, especially for branch routes with only limited traffic (e.g. seasonal lines). Modern switches for heavily trafficked lines are typically equipped with switch heaters installed in the vicinity of their point rails so that the point rails will not be frozen onto the stock rail and can no longer move. These heaters may take the form of electric heating elements or gas burners mounted on the rail, a lineside burner blowing hot air through ducts, or other innovative methods (e.g. geothermal heat sink, etc.) to keep the point & stock rails above freezing temperatures. Where gas or electric heaters cannot be used due to logistic or economic constraints, anti-icing chemicals can sometimes be applied to create a barrier between the metal surfaces to prevent ice from forming between them (i.e. having frozen together by ice). Such approaches however, may not always be effective for extreme climates since these chemicals will be washed away over time, especially for heavily thrown switches that experience hundreds of throws daily.

Heating alone may not always be enough to keep switches functioning under snowy conditions. Wet snow conditions, which generate particularly sticky snow and whiteout conditions, may occur at temperatures just below freezing, causing chunks of ice to accumulate on trains. When trains traverse over some switches, the shock, vibration, possibly in combination with slight heating caused by braking or a city microclimate, may cause the chunks of ice to fall off, jamming the switches. The heaters need time to melt the ice, so if service frequency is extremely high, there may not be enough time for the ice to melt before the next train arrives, which will then result in service disruptions. Possible solutions include installing higher capacity heaters, reducing the frequency of trains, or applying anti-icing chemicals like ethylene glycol to the trains.

Classification 

The divergence and length of a switch is determined by the angle of the frog (the point in the switch where two rails cross, see below) and the angle or curvature of the switch blades. The length and placement of the other components are determined from this using established formulas and standards. This divergence is measured as the number of units of length for a single unit of separation.

In North America this is generally referred to as a switch's "number". For example, on a "number 12" switch, the rails are one unit apart at a distance of twelve units from the center of the frog.

In the United Kingdom points and crossings using chaired bullhead rail would be referred to using a letter and number combination. The letter would define the length (and hence the radius) of the switch blades and the number would define the angle of the crossing (frog). Thus an A7 turnout would be very short and likely only to be found in tight places like dockyards whereas an E12 would be found as a fairly high speed turnout on a mainline.

On the London, Midland and Scottish Railway, switch curvatures were specified from A (sharpest) to F (shallowest), with the following corresponding radii:
 B -  - simple crossover with a 1 in 8 crossing angle
 C -  - scissors or simple crossover with a 1 in 10 crossing angle
 D -  - double track junction switch with a 1 in 12 crossing angle

Safety 
Switches are necessary for the operation of a railway, but they do pose a number of risks:
 Reversing the points under a moving train will almost always derail the train.
 Points might move due to the extreme forces exerted by a passing train. In an especially noteworthy and extreme case, a switch's setting was forcibly changed as a result of a disintegrated duo block wheel getting caught in a switch. This caused one of the world's worst rail disasters, the Eschede train disaster. 
 A train might stand so close to the frog of a switch that a passing train would collide with its side (the first train is then said to have been fouling the switch).
 The necessary maintenance of the complex mechanical device might be neglected.
 Tampering with a manually operable switch or operation errors in an interlocking may result in two trains being on the same track, potentially causing a collision.

To minimize accidents caused by these risks, suitable technical remedies as well as certain practices are applied. The most important are:
 Locks to prevent reversing a switch without a proper key.
 Interlockings that allow signals only to be cleared when switches are set correctly.
 Track circuits to prevent reversing when a passing train is detected.
 Point locks or clamps that prevent movement of blades by locking them to the stock rails in a secure manner.
 Track circuits and fouling markers to point out fouling vehicles.
 Maintenance schedules, especially for measuring deviations of critical distances.

Accidents
Switch-related accidents caused by one or more of these risks have occurred, including:
 The 1980 Buttevant Rail Disaster at Buttevant, County Cork, in Ireland, when the Dublin–Cork express was derailed at high speed after being inadvertently switched into a siding via ground frame operated points, resulting in 18 deaths.
To prevent these incidents, most unused switches are locked.
 The Eschede train disaster in 1998 in Germany was one of the world's deadliest high-speed train accidents, resulting in 101 deaths. The wheel rim went through the floor of the carriage and was dragging on the ground. While passing through the station at Eschede it threw a switch, causing the rear wheels of the car to switch onto a track diverging from the track taken by the front wheels. The car was thereby thrown into and destroyed the piers supporting a 300-tonne roadway overpass.
 The May 2002 Potters Bar rail crash at Potters Bar, Hertfordshire, in the United Kingdom, occurred when a switch sprang to a different position as a coach crossed it, a type of mishap called splitting the switch. The front wheels of a coach progressed along the straight track as intended, but the rear wheels slewed along the diverging track. This caused the whole coach to detach from the train and slew sideways across the platform ahead. The movement of the switch occurred beneath the final coach, so that the preceding coaches remained on the track. Poor maintenance of the points was found to be the primary cause of the crash.
 The interim report into the Grayrigg derailment of  blamed an incorrectly maintained set of points.
 Two fatal accidents involving the Amtrak Silver Star passenger train in South Carolina caused by switches either malfunctioning or misaligned.
 On July 31, 1991, several cars derailed, killing seven passengers, due to a missing locking pin on the switch mechanism. 
 Twenty-seven years later, on August 4, 2018, the Silver Star crashed into a parked freight train on a siding due to a misaligned switch, killing two crewmen.

Components

Points (point blades) 

The points (switch rails or point blades) are the movable rails which guide the wheels towards either the straight or the diverging track. They are tapered on most switches, but on stub switches they have square ends.

In the UK and Commonwealth countries, the term points refers to the entire mechanism, whereas in North America the term refers only to the movable rails.

In some cases, the switch blades can be heat treated for improvement of their service life. There are different kinds of heat treatment processes such as edge hardening or complete hardening.

The cross-section of the switch blades also influences performance. New tangential blades perform better than old-style blades.

Frog (common crossing) 

The frog, also known as the common crossing (or V-rail in Australian terminology), is the crossing point of two rails. This can be assembled out of several appropriately cut and bent pieces of rail or can be a single casting of manganese steel. On lines with heavy use the casting may be treated with explosive shock hardening to increase service life.

This term frog is taken from the part of a horse's hoof it most closely resembles. Certain types of overhead electrification systems that make use of trolley poles have similar devices referred to as wire frogs.

On dual-gauge switches, a special frog is used where the third rail crosses the common rail. Denver and Rio Grande crews called this a "toad".

A recent development on North American freight railroads is the flange-bearing frog, in which the wheel flange supports the weight of the vehicle as opposed to the tread. This design reduces impact loading and extends the life of the frog.

Guard rail (check rail) 

A guard rail (check rail) is a short piece of rail placed alongside the main (stock) rail opposite the frog. These ensure that the wheels follow the appropriate flangeway through the frog and that the train does not derail. Generally, there are two of these for each frog, one by each outer rail.

Check rails are often used on very sharp curves, even where there are no switches.

Switch motor 
A switch motor (also known as a switch machine, point motor, point machine, or automater) is an electric, hydraulic or pneumatic mechanism that aligns the points with one of the possible routes. The motor is usually controlled remotely by the dispatcher (signaller in the UK). The switch motor also includes electrical contacts to detect that the switch has completely set and locked. If the switch fails to do this, the governing signal is kept at red (stop). There is also usually some kind of manual handle for operating the switch in emergencies, such as power failures, or for maintenance purposes.

A patent by W. B. Purvis dates from 1897.

Points lever 
A points lever, ground throw, or switchstand is a lever and accompanying linkages that are used to align the points of a switch manually. This lever and its accompanying hardware is usually mounted to a pair of long sleepers that extend from the switch at the points. They are often used in a place of a switch motor on infrequently used switches. In some places, the lever may be some distance from the points, as part of a lever frame or ground frame. To prevent the tampering of switches by outside means, these switches are locked up when not in use.

Point machine conversion 
A point machine conversion system consist in a remotely controlled device attached to an existing manually operated point that allows the shunter or driver to remotely operate hand points with a radio handset. Each converter can be used as a stand-alone or multiple units can be installed operating together with routing.

Facing point lock 

A facing point lock (FPL), or point lock, is a device which, as the name implies, locks a set of points in position, as well as mechanically proving that they are in the correct position. The facing point part of the name refers to the fact that they prevent movement of the points during facing moves, where a train could potentially split the points (end up going down both tracks) if the points were to move underneath the train. During trailing moves, the wheels of a train will force the points into the correct position if they attempt to move, although this may cause considerable damage. This act is known as a "run through".

In the United Kingdom, FPLs were common from an early date, due to laws being passed which forced the provision of FPLs for any routes traveled by passenger trains – it was, and still is, illegal for a passenger train to make a facing move over points without them being locked, either by a point lock, or temporarily clamped in one position or another.

Joints 
Joints are used where the moving points meet the fixed rails of the switch. They allow the points to hinge easily between their positions. Originally the movable switch blades were connected to the fixed closure rails with loose joints, but since steel is somewhat flexible it is possible to obviate this looseness by thinning a short section of the rail's bottom itself. This can be called a heelless switch.

Straight and curved switches 
Turnouts were originally built with straight switch blades, which ended at the pointed end with a sharp angle. These switches cause a bump when the train traverses in the turnout direction. The switch blades could be made with a curved point which meets the stockrail at a tangent, causing less of a bump, but the disadvantage is that the metal at the point is thin and necessarily weak. A solution to these conflicting requirements was found in the 1920s on the German Reichsbahn. The first step was to have different rail profile for the stock rails and switch rails, with the switch rails being about  less high, and stockier in the middle.

Components gallery

Types 
Apart from the standard right-hand and left-hand switches, switches commonly come in various combinations of configurations.

Slip switches

Double slip 

A double slip switch (double slip) is a narrow-angled diagonal flat crossing of two lines combined with four pairs of points in such a way as to allow vehicles to change from one straight track to the other, alternatively to going straight across. A train approaching the arrangement may leave by either of the two tracks on the opposite side of the crossing. To reach the third possible exit, the train must change tracks on the slip and then reverse.

The arrangement gives the possibility of setting four routes, but because only one route can be traversed at a time, the four blades at each end of the crossing are often connected to move in unison, so the crossing can be worked by just two levers or point motors. This gives the same functionality of two points placed end to end. These compact (albeit complex) switches usually are found only in locations where space is limited, such as station throats (i.e. approaches) where a few main lines spread out to reach any of numerous platform tracks.

In North American English, the arrangement may also be called a double switch, or more colloquially, a puzzle switch. The Great Western Railway in the United Kingdom used the term double compound points, and the switch is also known as a double compound in Victoria (Australia). Likewise, it is called  in Dutch and, occasionally,  ("english one", literally "Englishman") in German.

Single slip 
A single slip switch works on the same principle as a double slip, but provides for only one switching possibility. Trains approaching on one of the two crossing tracks can either continue over the crossing, or switch tracks to the other line. However, trains from the other track can only continue over the crossing, and cannot switch tracks. This is normally used to allow access to sidings and improve safety by avoiding having switch blades facing the usual direction of traffic. To reach the sidings from what would be a facing direction, trains must continue over the crossing, then reverse along the curved route (usually onto the other line of a double track) and can then move forward over the crossing into the siding.

Outside slip 

An outside slip switch is similar to the double or single slip switches described above, except that the switch blades are outside of the diamond instead of inside. An advantage over an inside slip switch is that trains can pass the slips with higher speeds. A disadvantage over an inside slip switch is that they are longer and need more space.

An outside slip switch can be so long that its slips do not overlap at all, as in the example pictured. In such a case a single, outside slip switch is the same as two regular switches and a regular crossing. An outside, double slip switch is about the same as a scissors crossover (see below), but with the disadvantages:
 The two parallel tracks cannot be used at the same time.
 The slips are not straight and thus have a limited speed.
Advantage:
 The crossing can be passed at full speed.

Due to the disadvantages over both the double inside slip switch and the scissors crossover, double outside slip switches are only used in rare, specific cases.

Crossover  

A crossover is a pair of switches that connects two parallel rail tracks, allowing a train on one track to cross over to the other. Like the switches themselves, crossovers can be described as either facing or trailing.

When two crossovers are present in opposite directions, one after the other, the four-switch configuration is called a double crossover. If the crossovers in different directions overlap to form an ×, it is dubbed a scissors crossover, scissors crossing, or just scissors; or, due to the diamond in the center, a diamond crossover. This makes for a very compact track layout at the expense of using a level junction.

In a setup where each of the two tracks normally carries trains of only one direction, a crossover can be used either to detour "wrong-rail" around an obstruction or to reverse direction. A crossover can also join two tracks of the same direction, possibly a pair of local and express tracks, and allow trains to switch from one to the other.

On a crowded system, routine use of crossovers (or switches in general) will reduce throughput, as use of the switch blocks multiple tracks. For this reason, on some high-capacity rapid transit systems, crossovers between local and express tracks are not used during normal rush hour service, and service patterns are planned around use of the usually flying junctions at each end of the local-express line.

Stub switch 

A stub switch lacks the tapered points (point blades) of a typical switch. Instead, both the movable rails and the ends of the rails of the diverging routes have their ends cut off square. The switch mechanism aligns the movable rails with the rails of one of the diverging routes. In 19th century US railroad use, the stub switch was typically used in conjunction with a harp switch stand.

The rails leading up to a stub switch are not secured to the sleepers for several feet, and rail alignment across the gap is not positively enforced. Stub switches also require some flexibility in the rails (meaning lighter rails), or an extra joint at which they hinge. Therefore, these switches cannot be traversed at high speed or by heavy traffic and so are not suitable for main line use. A further disadvantage is that a stub switch being approached from the diverging route that is not connected by the points would result in a derailment. Yet another disadvantage is that in very hot weather, expansion of the steel in the rails can cause the movable rails to stick to the stock rails, making switching impossible until the rails have cooled and contracted.

One advantage to stub switches is that they work better in the snow. The sideways action of the point rails pushes snow to the side, instead of packing the snow between the points and the rail in a more modern design.

Stub switches were more common in the very early days of railways and their tramway predecessors. Now, because of their disadvantages, stub switches are used primarily on narrow gauge lines and branch lines. Some modern monorail switches use the same principle.

Three-way switch 

A three-way switch is used to split a railroad track into three divergent paths rather than the more usual two. There are two types of three-way switches. In a symmetrical three-way switch, the left and right branches diverge at the same place. In an asymmetrical three-way switch, the branches diverge in a staggered way. Both types of three-way switches require three frogs.

The complexity of symmetrical switches usually results in speed restrictions, therefore three-way switches are most often used in stations or depots where space is restricted and low speeds are normal. Symmetrical switches were used quite often on Swiss narrow-gauge railways. Asymmetrical three-way switches are more common, because they do not have speed restrictions compared to standard switches. However, because of their higher maintenance cost due to special parts as well as asymmetric wear, both types of three-way switches are replaced with two standard switches wherever possible.

In areas with very low speeds, like depots, and on railroads that had to be built very cheaply, like logging railroads, three-way switches were sometimes built as stub switches.

Plate switch 

A plate switch incorporates the tapered points of a typical switch into a self-contained plate. Each point blade is moved separately by hand. Plate switches are only used for double-flanged wheels, with wheels running through the plates on their flanges, guided by the edges of the plate and the movable blade.

Because plate switches can only be used by double-flanged wheels and at extremely low speeds, they are typically only found on hand-worked narrow gauge lines.

Off-railer 
The off-railer is a system of installing a turnout over and above some plain track, without having to cut or replace that track. It is useful for installing temporary branches on agricultural railways, and sidings for track machines on mainline rails. Special ramps lift the wheels off the normal track, and then the off-railer curves away as required. Decauville has such a system. It is a bit like a drawbridge crossing.

Interlaced turnout 

An interlaced turnout is a different method of splitting a track into three divergent paths. It is an arrangement of two standard turnouts, one left- and one right-handed, in an "interlaced" fashion. The points of the second turnout are positioned between the points and the frog of the first turnout. In common with other forms of three way turnouts an additional common-crossing is required. Due to the inherent complexity of the arrangement, interlaced turnouts are normally only used in locations where space is exceptionally tight, such as station throats or industrial areas within large cities. Interlaced turnouts can also be found in some yards, where a series of switches branching off to the same side are placed so close together that the points of one switch are placed before the frog of the preceding switch.

Wye switch 

A wye switch (Y points) has trailing ends which diverge symmetrically and in opposite directions. The name originates from the similarity of their shape to that of the letter Y. Wye switches are usually used where space is at a premium. In North America this is also called an "equilateral switch" or "equilateral turnout". Common switches are more often associated with mainline speeds, whereas wye switches are generally low-speed yard switches.

One advantage of wye switches is that they can have a coarser frog angle using the same radius of curvature than a common switch. This means that they give rise to a less severe speed restriction than the diverging branch of a common switch, without having to resort to more expensive switches with a moving frog. For this reason they are sometimes used on a main line where it splits into two equally important branches or at the ends of a single track section in an otherwise double track line.

Run-off points 

Run-off points are used to protect main lines from stray or runaway cars, or from trains passing signals set at danger. In these cases, vehicles would otherwise roll onto and foul (obstruct) the main line and cause a collision. Depending on the situation in which they are used, run-off points are referred to either as trap points or catch points. Derailers are another device used for the same purpose.

Catch points are installed on the running line itself, where the railway climbs at a steep gradient. They are used to prevent runaway vehicles colliding with another train further down the slope. In some cases, catch points lead into a sand drag to safely stop the runaway vehicle, which may be travelling at speed. Catch points are usually held in the 'derail' position by a spring. They can be set to allow a train to pass safely in the downhill direction using a lever or other mechanism to override the spring for a short time.

Catch points originate from the days of the 'unfitted' goods (freight) train. As these trains tended to consist of either completely unbraked wagons (relying entirely on the locomotive's own brakes), or ones with unlinked, manually applied brakes (necessitating a stop at the top of steep downgrades for the guard to walk along the train and set the brakes on each wagon in turn), they also lacked any mechanism to automatically brake runaway cars. Catch points were therefore required to stop the rear portion of a poorly coupled train that might break away whilst climbing a steep grade – although they would also stop vehicles that ran away for any other reason. Now that trains are all 'fitted' (and broken couplings are far less common), catch points are mostly obsolete.

Similar to catch points, trap points are provided at the exit from a siding or where a goods line joins a line that may be used by passenger trains. Unless they have been specifically set to allow traffic to pass onto the main line, the trap points will direct any approaching vehicle away from the main line. This may simply result in the vehicle being derailed, but in some cases a sand drag is used, especially where the vehicle is likely to be a runaway travelling at speed due to a slope.

Derailers 

A derailer works by derailing any vehicle passing over it. There are different types of derailers, but in some cases they consist of a single switch point installed in a track. The point can be pulled into a position to derail any equipment that is not supposed to pass through.

Dual gauge switches 

Dual gauge switches are used in dual gauge systems. There are various possible scenarios involving the routes that trains on each gauge may take, including the two gauges separating or one gauge being able to choose between diverging paths and the other not. Because of the extra track involved, dual gauge switches have more points and frogs than their single gauge counterparts. This limits speeds even more than usual.

A related formation is the 'swish' or rail exchange, where (usually) the common rail changes sides. These have no moving parts, the narrower gauge wheels being guided by guard rails as they transition from one rail to another. The wider gauge only encounters continuous rail so is unaffected by the exchange. At dual gauge turntables, a similar arrangement is used to move the narrow gauge track from one side to a central position.

Rack-railway switches 

Rack-railway switches are as varied as rack-railway technologies. Where use of the rack is optional, as on the Zentralbahn in Switzerland or the West Coast Wilderness Railway in Tasmania, it is common to place turnouts only in relatively flat areas where the rack is not needed. On systems where only the pinion is driven and the conventional rail wheels are idlers, such as the Dolderbahn in Zürich, Štrbské Pleso in Slovakia and the Schynige Platte rack railway, the rack must be continuous through the switch. The Dolderbahn switch works by bending all three rails, an operation that is performed every trip as the two trains pass in the middle. The Štrbské Pleso and Schynige Platte Strub rack system instead relies on a complex set of moving points which assemble the rack in the traversed direction and simultaneously clear the crossed direction conventional rails. In some rack systems, such as the Morgan system, where locomotives always have multiple driving pinions, it is possible to simplify turnouts by interrupting the rack rail, so long as the interruption is shorter than the spacing between the drive pinions on the locomotives.

Switch diamond 

Although not strictly speaking a turnout, a switch diamond is an active trackwork assembly used where the crossing angle between two tracks is too shallow for totally passive trackwork: the unguided sections of each rail would overlap. These vaguely resemble two standard points assembled very closely toe-to-toe. These would also often utilise swingnose crossings at the outer ends to ensure complete wheel support in the same way as provided on shallow angle turnouts. In North America these are known as Movable-Point Diamonds. In the UK, where the angle of divergence is shallower than 1 in 8 (center-line measure) a switched diamond will be found rather than a passive or fixed diamond.

Such switches are usually implemented on the basis of increasing the safe crossing speed. Open blades impose a speed restriction, due to the potential of the crossing impact fracturing the rail as both wheels on each axle hit the crossing gaps almost simultaneously. Switched blades, as shown in the photograph, allow a much higher speed across the gap by providing an essentially continuous piece of rail across the gap on both sides.

The frog end of the switched crossing, despite still having a gap in one rail, is less problematic in this regard. The outer rail is still continuous, the wing rail (the part that turns out, after the frog gap) provides a gradual transition, and the check rail avoids the possibility of points splitting. This can be seen in how, under examination, the wing rail has a wider polished section, showing how the wheel load is transferred across the gap.

Single-point switch 

Single point switches, known as Tongue and Plain Mate switches, are sometimes used on freight railways in slow speed operation in paved areas such as in ports. In the United States, they are regulated by provision 213.135(i) of the Federal Railroad Administration Track Safety Standards.

On streetcar (tram) systems using grooved rails, if the wheels on both sides of the car are connected by a rigid solid axle, only one switchpoint is needed to steer it onto one or the other track. The switchpoint will be on inside rail of the switch's curve route. When a streetcar enters the curve route of the switch, the wheel on the inside of the curve (the right side of the car on a right turn) is pulled into the turn, and through the axle, directs the wheel on the outside to also follow the curve. The outside wheel is supported for a short distance by its flange running in the groove.

Some low floor streetcar designs use split axles (a separate half-axle for the wheel on each side of the car). Such streetcars are unsuitable for use with single-point switches as there would be no mechanism to transfer the force from the inner to outer wheels at switches.

A single-point switch is cheaper to build, especially in street trackage, as there is no need to link to a second switchpoint.

Rotary switch 

Rotary switches are sometimes used on cog railways to maintain alignment of the cog with two different tracks. They are used on the Pilatus Cog Railway to allow up-bound and down-bound trains to pass each other on a grade while sharing the remainder of the single track.

A rotary switch rotates about its long axis to present a track connection to a chosen set of tracks. Physically, it flips over (rotates about its long axis 180 degrees) to connect to the chosen set of tracks. Once the rotary switch is secured the train can proceed. Cog alignment is maintained in both positions.

Temporary points 

When a tram track is interrupted during repairs, a set of temporary points may be placed on top of existing track to allow trams to cross to the parallel track. They may be welded into place and allow trams to pass at walking pace.

Expansion joint 
Expansion joints look like a part of a railroad switch, but have a completely different purpose, namely to compensate for the shrinkage or expansion of the road bed – e.g. typically, a larger steel bridge – due to changes in temperature, to avoid sun kink.

Turnout speeds 

Turnout speeds are governed by a number of factors.

As a general rule, the smaller the crossing angle of a turnout, the higher the turnout speed.
In North America, turnouts are rated numerically, which represents the ratio of divergence per length as measured at the frog. A rule of thumb is that the rated speed of a switch (in miles per hour) is twice the numerical rating:
  15: 
  20: 

Higher speed turnouts have also been used in the United States:
  26.5: 
  32.7: 

In most other countries, switches are marked with tangent of crossing angle. For example, Russia and the rest of the Commonwealth of Independent States (CIS) use the following designations:
 1/6: sorting yards only, whenever it is impossible to install a better switch
 1/9: , the most common switch, installed by default
 1/11: , used where passenger trains follow a diverging path. Swingnose crossing may be installed if required.
 1/18: , used where either non-interruptible movement is required or the mainline diverges from the branch line
 1/22: , rarely used, high-speed lines only

In Germany, Austria, Switzerland, Czech Republic, Poland and other European countries, switches are described by the radius of the branching track (in meters) and the tangent of the frog angle. The crossing may be straight, as in a crossover, or curved for other uses. The following designations are typical examples:
 190-1:9, the most common switch, for 40 km/h on the branch track
 300-1:9, preferred over 190-1:9 since the 1990s, for 50 km/h
 500-1:12, for 60 km/h (signalled speed, capability: 65 km/h)
 760-1:14, for 80 km/h
 1200-1:18.5, for 100 km/h
 2500-1:26.5, for 130 km/h (in Czech Rep, signalled speed is 120 km/h) (swingnose only)

In New South Wales standard turnouts of tangential types include:
 1/7.5
 1/8.25
 see also NSW 1 in 8.25 crossing
 1/10.5
 1/12.0
 1/15

Uganda 
 1 in 16, for 100 km/h;

General 
Other considerations include the type of turnout (e.g. normal nose, swing nose, slips), wear and tear issues, and the weight and type of the vehicle passing over. Speeds for a trailing movement may be higher than for a facing movement. In many systems, speed limits vary depending on the type of train; for example, a turnout can have a "normal" speed limit for locomotive hauled trains, and a higher speed for multiple unit or high speed trains.

Turnouts with curved or tangential switch blades have higher speed than old style turnouts with straight switch blades.

Older turnouts use the same rail section, shaved down, for both stock rail and switch blade. Newer tangential turnouts use a stubbier rail section for the switch blade.

Assembly and transport 

Turnouts are large pieces of rail infrastructure which may be too big, wide, or heavy to transport in one piece. Special wagons can carry the pieces at approximately 45° from vertical, so that they fit within the structure gauge. Once all the pieces have arrived, the turnout is assembled sleeper by sleeper on site. A set of turnouts may be trial assembled beforehand off site, to check that everything fits.

See also 

 Centralized traffic control
 Double junction
 
 Gauntlet track
 Glossary of rail transport terms (US/UK differences highlighted)
 Level junction
 Minimum railway curve radius
 
 
 Railway signal
 Railway turntable
 Transfer table

References

Further reading

External links 

 

Articles containing video clips
Mechanisms (engineering)
Rail infrastructure
Rail junction types